Saint-Rémy-l'Honoré is a commune in the Yvelines department in the Île-de-France in north-central France.

See also
Communes of the Yvelines department

References

External links

 Official town website 

Communes of Yvelines